Dragonflight is a 1968 science-fiction novel by Anne McCaffrey

Dragonflight may also refer to:
 Dragonflight (convention), a gaming convention established in 1980
 World of Warcraft: Dragonflight, a 2022 expansion pack for the MMORPG World of Warcraft
 Dragon Flight, a civilian formation flight demonstration team, based at March Air Reserve Base

See also 
 The Flight of Dragons, film
 The Flight of Dragons (book), by Peter Dickinson